Ōbaku (黄檗 Japanese Ōbaku, pinyin Huángbò) is the Amur Corktree. It may refer to:
Mount Huangbo, a mountain in China's Fujian province, noted for its Buddhist temples
Mount Ōbaku (Ōbaku-san), a mountain in the city of Uji in Japan
Huangbo Xiyun (黄檗希運), a Chinese Chan Buddhist master
The Japanese Ōbaku School (黄檗宗) of Zen Buddhism

Obaku may also refer to:
Obaku, Nigeria, a village